Abylopsis is a siphonophore genus in the Abylidae. The genus contains bioluminescent species.

References

Bioluminescent cnidarians

Hydrozoan genera
Abylidae